Margaret Iwasaki (born 10 May 1942) is a Canadian former freestyle and butterfly swimmer. She competed in three events at the 1960 Summer Olympics.

References

External links
 

1942 births
Living people
Canadian female butterfly swimmers
Canadian female freestyle swimmers
Olympic swimmers of Canada
Swimmers at the 1960 Summer Olympics
Swimmers from Vancouver
Swimmers at the 1959 Pan American Games
Pan American Games silver medalists for Canada
Pan American Games medalists in swimming
Swimmers at the 1958 British Empire and Commonwealth Games
Commonwealth Games medallists in swimming
Commonwealth Games silver medallists for Canada
Commonwealth Games bronze medallists for Canada
Medalists at the 1959 Pan American Games
20th-century Canadian women
Medallists at the 1958 British Empire and Commonwealth Games